Jiří Mádl   (born October 23, 1986 in České Budějovice, Czechoslovakia) is a Czech actor, director and screenwriter.

Among his most prominent roles are a part in the 2008 film Night Owls, for which received the Best Actor award at the 2008 Karlovy Vary International Film Festival.
Jiří Mádl participated in creating a plagiary of Sarah Silverman's election commercial in 2010. However, people claimed that the plagiary is based on antigerontism not present in the original commercial. He came to prominence when he starred in Czech movies Konfident (The Confidant), Snowboarďáci (Snowboarders), Gympl (The Can), Probudím se Včera (I Wake Up Yesterday), Děti noci (Night Owls) and Hra (The Play). He also appeared in international projects Borgia, Interlude in Prague and Berlin Eins.

Mádl made his directorial debut with the movie Pojedeme k moři. His second movie Na Střeše (On the Roof) was released in 2019. 

He is the youngest actor to win Crystal Globe for the best actor in the leading role at The Karlovy Vary International Film Festival.

He is a member of The European Film Academy and The Council of Dramaturgy at The Zlin Film Festival for Children and Youth.

Charity activities    
He is the founder of ArteFond, which financially supports children gifted in arts in children´s homes. Jiří and his brother Jan Mádl are organizers of a charity football match in České Budějovice, which has been held since 2009. He has been a patron of The Day of Children´s Oncology in the Czech Republic for several years, and he has been supporting Arpida Centre in České Budějovice.

Other activities 
In March 2010, he participated together with Martha Issová and Petr Zelenka in the preparations on a political video focused on youth titled “Encourage your grandma and grandpa not to vote for a left wing”. After the release of the video, a disgruntlement aroused, and its content became a huge topic for both personal blogs and online newspapers.

He is one of the founders of Hugo Bike. He sold his part of the business in 2016.

In 2018, he founded the project "Europe in Data" with Tomáš Jindříšek and Radek Špicar.

He has been a shareholder of The Outdoor Trip company since 2018.

Partial filmography
 2014 - Vejška
 2013 - Colette
 2012 - Čtyři slunce
 2009 - Peklo s princeznou (It Is Hell With the Princess) - Prince Jeroným
Ctrl Emotion
 2008 - Night Owls
 2007 Gympl
 2006 - Bathory - Monk Cyril
Snadné je žít (It Is Easy To Live) - Brother of Madona
 2005 - Rafťáci - Filip
Jak se krotí krokodýli (Taming Crocodiles) - Vašek Rychman
Hypnóza (Hypnosis - TV film) - Péťa
 2004 - Snowboarďáci (Snowboarders) - Jáchym

References

Czech male film actors
Living people
1986 births
Actors from České Budějovice
Czech film directors
Film people from České Budějovice
Czech Lion Awards winners